Wilber Mauricio Pérez Medrano (born 29 September 1988) is a Guatemalan international footballer who plays as a striker for Primera División club USAC.

Career
Born in Jalpatagua, he has played club football for Antigua GFC, Suchitepéquez, Coatepeque, Petapa, Municipal, Cobán Imperial, Guastatoya, Marquense, Sanarate and Gjilani.

He made his international debut for Guatemala in 2013.

International goals
Scores and results list Guatemala's goal tally first.

References

1988 births
Living people
Guatemalan footballers
Guatemala international footballers
Antigua GFC players
C.D. Suchitepéquez players
Deportivo Coatepeque players
Deportivo Petapa players
C.S.D. Municipal players
Cobán Imperial players
C.D. Guastatoya players
Deportivo Marquense players
Deportivo Sanarate F.C. players
SC Gjilani players
C.D. Malacateco players
Football Superleague of Kosovo players
Liga Nacional de Fútbol de Guatemala players
Guatemalan expatriate footballers
Guatemalan expatriates in Kosovo
Expatriate footballers in Kosovo
Association football forwards